David Saul Landes (April 29, 1924 – August 17, 2013) was a professor of economics and of history at Harvard University. He is the author of Bankers and Pashas, Revolution in Time, The Unbound Prometheus, The Wealth and Poverty of Nations, and Dynasties. Such works have received both praise for detailed retelling of economic history, as well as scorn on charges of Eurocentrism, a charge he openly embraced, arguing that an explanation for an economic miracle that happened originally only in Europe must of necessity be a Eurocentric analysis.

Career

Landes earned a Ph.D. from Harvard University in 1953 and an B.A. from City College of New York in 1942.  While he waited his call up to serve in World War II, Landes studied cryptanalysis. He was assigned to the Signal Corps where he worked on deciphering coded Japanese messages.

Historian Niall Ferguson called him one of his "most revered mentors".

Landes was a member of the American Academy of Arts and Sciences, the United States National Academy of Sciences, and the American Philosophical Society.

His son is Richard Landes, the American historian and author, an associate professor in the Department of History at Boston University.

Works 
 
 
 
 
 Landes, David S., Bankers and Pashas: International Finance and Economic Imperialism in Egypt (1958)

See also
 Environmental determinism

References

External links 
 Association for the Study of the Middle East and Africa (ASMEA)
 

Members of the United States National Academy of Sciences
American economic historians
American economists
Jewish American historians
George Washington University faculty
Harvard University alumni
Harvard University faculty
1924 births
2013 deaths
Leonardo da Vinci Medal recipients
City College of New York alumni
Members of the American Philosophical Society